The Roman Catholic Diocese of San Carlos de Venezuela is a diocese located in the city of San Carlos in the Ecclesiastical province of Valencia en Venezuela in Venezuela.

History
On 16 May 1972 Pope Paul VI established the Diocese of San Carlos de Venezuela from Diocese of Valencia.

Ordinaries
Medardo Luis Luzardo Romero † (16 May 1972 – 20 Aug 1979) Appointed, Bishop of Ciudad Guayana
Antonio Arellano Durán † (3 Jun 1980 – 27 Dec 2002)
Jesús Tomás Zárraga Colmenares (27 Dec 2002 – 2014)

See also
Roman Catholicism in Venezuela

Sources
 GCatholic.org
 Catholic Hierarchy 

Roman Catholic dioceses in Venezuela
Roman Catholic Ecclesiastical Province of Valencia en Venezuela
Christian organizations established in 1972
Roman Catholic dioceses and prelatures established in the 20th century
1972 establishments in Venezuela
Roman Catholic diocese